Agustín Hernán Felipe Parra Repetto (born June 10, 1989) is a Chilean former professional footballer who played for Santiago Wanderers.

International career
He represented Chile U23 at the 2008 Inter Continental Cup in Malaysia. After, he represented Chile U21 and Chile U22 at the Toulon Tournament in 2009 and 2010, respectively. Chile won the 2009 edition.

At senior level, he was a substitute in the friendly match against Haiti on January 19, 2013.

Honours

Club
Santiago Wanderers
 Copa Chile (1): 2017

International
Chile U21
 Toulon Tournament (1): 2009

References

External links
 
 

1989 births
Living people
Chilean people of Italian descent
People from Viña del Mar
Chilean footballers
Santiago Wanderers footballers
Chilean Primera División players
Primera B de Chile players
Association football defenders